Henry Rowland may refer to:

Henry Augustus Rowland (1848–1901), American physicist
Henry Augustus Rowland (minister) (1804–1859), American minister
Henry Rowland (actor) (1913–1984), American actor

See also
Henry Rowland-Brown (1865–1921), English entomologist
Henry Rowlands (1655–1723), author